Kelley Cain (born May 16, 1989) is an American basketball center who last played for the Connecticut Sun of the WNBA. Born in Stone Mountain, Georgia, she went to St. Pius X Catholic High School (Georgia) and played collegiately for the Tennessee. Currently she plays for Güre Belediye Woman Basketball Club in İzmir, Turkey.

USA Basketball
Cain was a member of the USA Women's U18 team which won the gold medal at the FIBA Americas Championship in Colorado Springs, Colorado. The event was held in July 2006, when the USA team defeated Canada to win the championship. Cain helped the team the gold medal, scoring 6.5 points per game. Her field goal percentage of 57.9% was second among all contestants, and her 1.75 blocks per game was tied for first (with Jayne Appel)

Tennessee statistics

Source

WNBA
She was selected in the first round of the 2012 WNBA Draft (7th overall) by the New York Liberty, while she was playing in Turkey for Güre Belediye Woman Basketball Club in İzmir.

References

External links
What Can We Expect Kelley Cain To Contribute To The New York Liberty? from SwishAppeal

1989 births
Living people
American expatriate basketball people in Turkey
American women's basketball players
Basketball players from Georgia (U.S. state)
Connecticut Sun players
McDonald's High School All-Americans
New York Liberty draft picks
New York Liberty players
Parade High School All-Americans (girls' basketball)
People from Stone Mountain, Georgia
Sportspeople from DeKalb County, Georgia
Tennessee Lady Volunteers basketball players
Centers (basketball)